Mount Kershaw is a mountain,  high, rising above Jones Ice Shelf and Kosiba Wall in the northeast end of Blaiklock Island, off the west coast of Graham Land, Antarctica. It was named by the UK Antarctic Place-Names Committee after Giles E.G. Kershaw (1948–1990), a British Antarctic Survey senior pilot, 1974–79, and pilot on the Transglobe Expedition, 1980–82, and other expeditions. He was killed in a flying accident on Jones Ice Shelf, March 5, 1990, and his remains now rest near the foot of this mountain.

References

Mountains of Graham Land
Fallières Coast